Slicer may refer to:

Food slicers 
 Egg slicer
 Meat slicer
 Spiral vegetable slicer
 Tomato slicer

Software 

3D Slicer, a free and open source software package for image analysis and scientific visualization
 Slicer (3D printing), computer software used in the majority of 3D printing processes

TV episodes 
 "The Slicer" (Seinfeld), 163rd episode of the NBC sitcom

Other 
 Slicer (guitar effect)
 Slicer (enzyme), part of the RISC complex causing mRNA degradation

See also
 Slice (disambiguation)